Steppenwolf is the debut album by Canadian-American rock band Steppenwolf, released in January 1968 on ABC Dunhill Records.

The album was a successful debut for the band, featuring the songs "Born to Be Wild", as well as "The Pusher", both of which were used in the 1969 film Easy Rider. "Berry Rides Again" is a tribute to guitarist Chuck Berry. The spelling of track #4 on the vinyl is "Hootchie Kootchie Man". The album credits say it was recorded at American Recording Company in Studio City, California; however, the actual name of the studio was American Recorders.

The background color of the original ABC LP cover was a silver "foil", in contrast to later (MCA Records) LP issues and the modern CD sleeve in which it is replaced by off white. It is the only album by the band to have been released in both stereo and mono configurations. Although most of the latter is simply a 'fold down' of the stereo mix, it is sought after as a collector's item.

Early editions of the "silver foil background" version credit "Mars Bonfire" with writing "Born to be Wild" on both the LP label and the back of the LP cover.

Following the success of "Born to Be Wild", later releases had a black box on the cover with the wording: "Including The Hit: Born to Be Wild". The earliest 1968 versions of the album did not have this.

Track listing

Personnel
Steppenwolf
 John Kay – lead vocals, guitars, harmonica
 Michael Monarch – guitars, backing vocals
 Goldy McJohn – Hammond organ, piano, Wurlitzer electric piano
 Rushton Moreve – bass guitar, backing vocals
 Jerry Edmonton – drums, backing vocals, percussion

Technical
 Gabriel Mekler – producer 
 Bill Cooper – engineer
 Richard Podolor – engineer
 Gary Burden – art direction, cover design
 Tom Gundelfinger – photography
 Henry Diltz – photography

Charts
Album - Billboard (United States)

Singles - Billboard (United States)

References

1968 debut albums
Steppenwolf (band) albums
ABC Records albums
Albums produced by Gabriel Mekler
Dunhill Records albums